{
  "type": "ExternalData",
  "service": "geoline",
  "ids": "Q6151888",
  "properties": {
    "stroke": "#139593",
    "stroke-width": 6
  }
}
The  ERL KLIA Transit is a commuter rail service which serves as an airport rail link to the Kuala Lumpur International Airport (KLIA) in Malaysia. It runs from KL Sentral, the main railway station of Kuala Lumpur to KLIA as well as its low-cost terminal, klia2. The line is one of the two services on the Express Rail Link (ERL) system, sharing the same tracks as the KLIA Ekspres. KLIA Transit stops at all stations along the line, whereas KLIA Ekspres runs an express, non-stop service between KL Sentral and KLIA and links KLIA with KLIA2. The ERL is operated by Express Rail Link Sdn. Bhd. (ERL).

The line is one of the components of the Klang Valley Integrated Transit System. It is numbered  and coloured teal on official transit maps.

Line information

Stations 
There are six stations served by KLIA Transit. They are, from north to south:

At KL Sentral, the two platforms of the ERL are accessed from different parts of the station. The KLIA Ekspres side platforms are accessed from the KL City Air Terminal (KL CAT) while the KLIA Transit island platform is accessed from the main Transit Concourse at Level 1. At KLIA and klia2, both KLIA Ekspres and KLIA Transit use the same island platform, with each service serving only one side of the platform.

History 
KLIA Transit began operations on 20 June 2002. Since then there has only been one major accident.

Accidents 
On 24 August 2010, Express Rail Link suffered their first reported accident in which 3 passengers were injured. Two ERL trains collided at Kuala Lumpur Sentral. One of the trains involved was about to depart at 9.45pm for Kuala Lumpur International Airport while the other train, which was empty, ran into it from behind.

Suspensions 
On 4 April 2020, due to the Malaysian movement control order, which resulted in a significant reduction in ridership, all ERL rail services were temporarily suspended. Limited ERL services recommenced on 4 May 2020.

On 4 June 2021, due to the total lockdown phase of the Malaysian movement control order, all ERL rail services were temporarily suspended again. ERL services resumed on 10 September 2021.

Operations

Journey 
Distance: 57 kilometres from KL Sentral to KLIA
Duration: 36 minutes
Train Frequency: Once every 15 minutes(peak hours), Once every half-hour(non-peak hours, weekends)
Departure Times:
KL Sentral
First train at 0533hrs
Last train at 0003hrs
KLIA
First train at 0552hrs
Last train at 0100hrs

Fares 

Fares depend on the direct train service and the distance travelled. Seat reservation is not required. The KLIA Transit fares for KL Sentral-KLIA/klia2 and KLIA/klia2-KL Sentral are the same as KLIA Ekspres however both train service tickets are not interchangeable. There are 30% reduced fares for senior citizens & OKU card holders, though this reduction applies only to Malaysian citizens. Children below two years may travel for free.

Check-in facilities are not available at KLIA Transit stations. However, passengers holding KLIA Ekspres tickets are allowed to check-in luggage for several airlines at the KL CAT in KL Sentral.

The following is the fare structure for a one-way trip since 14 April 2002 and additional station on May 2014 with the opening of klia2:

The following is the fare structure for a one-way trip with effect from January 2016:

Frequent users have the options of buying weekly or monthly passes called "KLIA Transit Travel Card". The holders of these cards enjoy discounted fares as follows, as of May 2011:-

a) Card purchased for departure from Putrajaya station to the following arrival station:-
 KL Sentral  (Weekly card cost RM 75.00, and Monthly card cost RM 285.00)
 Bandar Tasik Selatan (Weekly card cost RM 60.00, and Monthly card cost RM 160.00)
 Salak Tinggi (Weekly card cost RM 30.00, and Monthly card cost RM 90.00)
 KLIA (Weekly card cost RM 60.00, and Monthly card cost RM 185.00)

b) Card purchased for departure from KLIA station to the following arrival station:-
 KL Sentral  (Weekly card not available for sale, and Monthly card cost RM 300.00)
 Bandar Tasik Selatan (Weekly card not available for sale, and Monthly card cost RM 250.00)
 Putrajaya & Cyberjaya (Weekly card not available for sale, and Monthly card cost RM 185.00)
 Salak Tinggi (Weekly card not available for sale, and Monthly card cost RM 130.00)

c) Card purchased for departure from Salak Tinggi station to the following arrival station:-
 KL Sentral  (Weekly card not available for sale, and Monthly card cost RM 285.00)
 Bandar Tasik Selatan (Weekly card not available for sale, and Monthly card cost RM 250.00)
 Note: Other arrival stations are not available for card purchase from this departure station

Connection to Subang Airport 
The KLIA Transit (and KLIA Ekspres) interchanges with KTM's Skypark Link at KL Sentral, an airport-rail link serving the Sultan Abdul Aziz Shah Airport (Subang Airport). This allows for a rail connection between KLIA, klia2 and Subang Airport.

Ridership

Gallery

See also 
 Express Rail Link
 KLIA Ekspres
 Public transport in Kuala Lumpur

References

External links 

The KLIA Transit at the official KLIA Ekspres website.

Route maps 
Route search - Interactive transport guide of Kuala Lumpur public transport system
Route Map from malaysiaexpat.com
Route Map from ktmb.com.my
Route Map from prasarana.com.my
Route Map from stesensentral.com

Express Rail Link
2002 establishments in Malaysia
Railway services introduced in 2002
Kuala Lumpur International Airport
25 kV AC railway electrification